Ikenne Community High School is a secondary school in Ikenne Remo. It was founded in 1976 by the community development association.

Ikenne Community High School was located at the out skirt of Ikenne, along Sagamu-Benin expressway.

The school has produce over Ten thousand student and main competitor to Mayflower School.

References 

1976 establishments
1976 establishments in Nigeria
Secondary schools in Ogun State
Secondary schools in Nigeria